Daniel Joseph Kaspar (born November 16, 1954) is an American college basketball coach. Kaspar served as men's basketball head coach at the University of the Incarnate Word, Stephen F. Austin State University, and Texas State University. He has also been an assistant coach at Lamar, Midwestern State and Baylor.

Early life
Born in Corpus Christi, Texas, Kaspar graduated from Mary Carroll High School in Corpus Christi in 1973. He then attended Texas A&I University, a NAIA program at the time, and played shooting guard on the Texas A&I Javelinas basketball team for one year. He then transferred to McLennan Community College in Waco, Texas and North Texas State University. On the North Texas State Mean Green basketball team, Kaspar averaged 7 points as a junior in 1976–77 and 4.2 points as a senior in 1977–78. Kaspar graduated from North Texas State in 1978.

Coaching career
Kaspar began his career as an assistant coach to Billy Tubbs at Division I Lamar University in the 1979–80 season, a season when Lamar finished the regular season first in the Southland Conference and advanced to the Sweet 16 round of the NCAA Tournament. In 1980, Kaspar became an assistant coach at Division II Midwestern State. Kaspar then became an assistant on Harry Miller's staff at Stephen F. Austin in 1983 for three seasons, including two seasons in Stephen F. Austin's transition from Division II to Division I (1984–1986).

From 1986 to 1991, Kaspar was an assistant to Gene Iba at Baylor.

Incarnate Word (1991–2000)
Kaspar was head coach at the NAIA program Incarnate Word for nine seasons from 1991 to 2000 and had a 219–52 record there. In his tenure at Incarnate Word, Kaspar earned four Heart of Texas Conference Coach of the Year honors and led Incarnate Word to five regular season conference championships.

Stephen F. Austin (2000–2013)
In 2000, Kaspar returned to Stephen F. Austin to be head coach, having previously been an assistant coach from 1983 to 1986. Kaspar had a 246–141 record at Stephen F. Austin. Stephen F. Austin had six seasons with 20 or more wins under Kaspar's tenure, four regular season Southland Conference championships, and made the 2009 NCAA tournament after winning the Southland tournament that year. Additionally, Stephen F. Austin appeared in the National Invitation Tournament in 2008 and 2013.

Texas State (2013–2020)
Kaspar became head coach at Texas State in 2013. Texas State finished 8–23 in Kaspar's first season. In seven seasons he has compiled a 119-109 record and lead his team to two CollegeInsider.com Postseason Tournament appearances. In June 2020, Kaspar was placed under investigation by the university after former player Jaylen Shead stated Kaspar dropped "a series of N-bombs around African-American players." On September 22, 2020, Kaspar announced his resignation from Texas State.

Head coaching record

 

1.Cancelled due to the Coronavirus Pandemic

References

1954 births
Living people
American men's basketball coaches
American men's basketball players
Basketball coaches from Texas
Basketball players from Texas
Baylor Bears men's basketball coaches
College men's basketball head coaches in the United States
Incarnate Word Cardinals men's basketball coaches
Junior college men's basketball players in the United States
Lamar Cardinals basketball coaches
McLennan Community College alumni
Midwestern State Mustangs men's basketball coaches
North Texas Mean Green men's basketball players
Sportspeople from Corpus Christi, Texas
Stephen F. Austin Lumberjacks basketball coaches
Texas A&M–Kingsville Javelinas men's basketball players
Texas State Bobcats men's basketball coaches
Texas A&I University alumni
Shooting guards